A list of universities and colleges in Northern Cyprus. Northern Cyprus, officially the Turkish Republic of Northern Cyprus, is a state with limited recognition that comprises the northern portion of the island of Cyprus.

Universities & Institutions that offer Bachelor's degree or above 

You can find the complete list of North Cyprus Universities on RocApply

Colleges that offer higher education degrees below Bachelor's

References

Northern Cyprus education-related lists
Northern Cyprus
Northern Cyprus

Lists of organisations based in Northern Cyprus